Gadap Town is a town in the northwestern part of Karachi with the Hub River on its western limits also forming the provincial border between Sindh and Balochistan, while to the north and east are Jamshoro District and the Kirthar Mountains.

In 2018, there was a polio vaccination drive going on in Gadap Town.

See also 
 City District Government

References

External links
 Official Karachi Website
 Official Gadap Town Webpage

 
Malir District
Towns in Karachi